space-time prisoners (时空囚徒) is a vampire survival action Chinese webcomic written and illustrated by Bai Xiao. On October 1, 2016, a Chinese-Japanese animation adaptation titled  began airing. The series is directed by Chen Ye and produced by Emon and animated by NAMU Animation and Creators in Pack.

Plot
60 years ago, some people began to suffer from a strange case of insomnia that struck the entire population. Unable to sleep for more than a week, a large number of people become completely sleep deprived and eventually went mad with rage. A new medicine was produced to cure the illness but it has a side effect which turned patients into vampires. Later, these vampires were called the "Bloodivores." They are feared by other people and wear a special necklace that sends a signal to the police if a Bloodivore is unable to control their emotions.

Mi Liu is called a "child of hope" — born from a human and a Bloodivore — but when he along with his three friends are vilified for killing all humans in a bank they robbed, they are sentenced to death. Then a strange thing happens where they are thrown into a mysterious place with a lot of unexplainable monsters along with other sentenced-to-death prisoners. A girl greets them and reveals they have been given new collars that are filled with explosives to prevent them from killing other bloodivores. She then announces their mission: to survive.

Cast
Kenji Akabane as Mi Liu (弥流)
Eri Kitamura as Anji (左安琪)
Takuya Satō as Lee Shin
Sho Hayami as Lou Yao

Music
The opening song is "Nenten" by Mili and the ending theme song is "Quiet Squall" by Siraph.

References

External links
 

Manhua titles
Action anime and manga
Animated series based on comics
Japanese action television series
Tokyo MX original programming
Creators in Pack
Vampires in anime and manga
Vampires in animated television
Chinese webcomics
2010s webcomics
Vampires in comics
Chinese animated television series
2016 anime television series debuts
2016 Chinese television series debuts
Haoliners Animation League
Tencent manhua
Television shows based on webcomics
Television shows based on manhua
Manhua adapted into television series
2015 webcomic debuts